This is a list of the bird species recorded in Namibia. The avifauna of Namibia included a total of 685 confirmed species as of September 2021, of which 1 is endemic, and four have been introduced by humans. One additional species is hypothetical as defined below. Unless otherwise noted, the list is that of Avibase.

This list's taxonomic treatment (designation and sequence of orders, families and species) and nomenclature (English and scientific names) are those of The Clements Checklist of Birds of the World, 2022 edition. Differences in common and scientific names between the Clements taxonomy and that of the NBRC are frequent but are seldom noted here.

The following tags have been used to highlight several categories of occurrence.

(V) Vagrant - a species that rarely or accidentally occurs in Namibia
(E) Endemic - a species endemic to Namibia
(I) Introduced - a species introduced to Namibia as a consequence, direct or indirect, of human actions, and which has a self-sustaining population
(H) Hypothetical - a species possibly present but which has not been documented

Order: Struthioniformes
Common name: OstrichesFamily: Struthionidae

Ostriches are flightless birds native to Africa. They are the largest living species of bird. They are distinctive in appearance, with a long neck and legs and the ability to run at high speeds.

Common ostrich, Struthio camelus
South African ostrich, S. c. australis

Order: Anseriformes

Common name: Ducks, geese, and waterfowlFamily: Anatidae

Anatidae includes the ducks and most duck-like waterfowl, such as geese and swans. These birds are adapted to an aquatic existence with webbed feet, flattened bills, and feathers that are excellent at shedding water due to an oily coating.

White-faced whistling-duck, Dendrocygna viduata
Fulvous whistling-duck, Dendrocygna bicolor
White-backed duck, Thalassornis leuconotus
Knob-billed duck, Sarkidiornis melanotos
Egyptian goose, Alopochen aegyptiacus
South African shelduck, Tadorna cana
Spur-winged goose, Plectropterus gambensis
African pygmy-goose, Nettapus auritus
Garganey, Spatula querquedula (V)
Blue-billed teal, Spatula hottentota
Cape shoveler, Spatula smithii
Northern shoveler, Spatula clypeata (V)
African black duck, Anas sparsa
Yellow-billed duck, Anas undulata
Mallard, Anas platyrhynchos (I)
Cape teal, Anas capensis
Red-billed duck, Anas erythrorhyncha
Southern pochard, Netta erythrophthalma
Maccoa duck, Oxyura maccoa

Order: Galliformes

Guineafowl

Family: Numididae

Guineafowl are a group of African, seed-eating, ground-nesting birds that resemble partridges, but with featherless heads and spangled grey plumage.

Helmeted guineafowl, Numida meleagris
Western crested guineafowl, Guttera verreauxi

Pheasants, grouse, and allies

Family: Phasianidae

The Phasianidae are a family of terrestrial birds which consists of quails, partridges, snowcocks, francolins, spurfowls, tragopans, monals, pheasants, peafowls, and jungle fowls. In general, they are plump (although they vary in size) and have broad, relatively short wings.

Crested francolin, Ortygornis sephaena
Coqui francolin, Campocolinus coqui
Orange River francolin, Scleroptila gutturalis
Common quail, Coturnix coturnix
Harlequin quail, Coturnix delegorguei
Hartlaub's francolin, Pternistis hartlaubi
Red-billed francolin, Pternistis adspersus
Cape francolin, Pternistis capensis
Swainson's francolin, Pternistis swainsonii
Red-necked francolin, Pternistis afer

Order: Phoenicopteriformes
Common name: FlamingosFamily: Phoenicopteridae

Flamingos filter-feed on shellfish and algae. Their oddly shaped beaks are specially adapted to separate mud and silt from the food they consume and, uniquely, are used upside-down.

Greater flamingo, Phoenicopterus roseus
Lesser flamingo, Phoeniconaias minor

Order: Podicipediformes
Common name: GrebesFamily: Podicipedidae

Grebes are small to medium-large freshwater diving birds. They have lobed toes and are excellent swimmers and divers. However, they have their feet placed far back on the body, making them quite ungainly on land.

Little grebe, Tachybaptus ruficollis
Great crested grebe, Podiceps cristatus
Eared grebe, Podiceps nigricollis

Order: Columbiformes
Common name: Pigeons and dovesFamily: Columbidae

Pigeons and doves are stout-bodied birds with short necks and short slender bills with a fleshy cere.

Rock pigeon, Columba livia (I)
Speckled pigeon, Columba guinea
European turtle-dove, Streptopelia turtur (V)
Mourning collared-dove, Streptopelia decipiens
Red-eyed dove, Streptopelia semitorquata
Ring-necked dove, Streptopelia capicola
Laughing dove, Streptopelia senegalensis
Emerald-spotted wood-dove, Turtur chalcospilos
Namaqua dove, Oena capensis
African green-pigeon, Treron calva

Order: Pterocliformes
Common name: SandgrouseFamily: Pteroclidae

Sandgrouse have small, pigeon-like heads and necks, but sturdy compact bodies. They have long pointed wings and sometimes tails and a fast direct flight. Flocks fly to watering holes at dawn and dusk. Their legs are feathered down to the toes.

Namaqua sandgrouse, Pterocles namaqua
Yellow-throated sandgrouse, Pterocles gutturalis
Double-banded sandgrouse, Pterocles bicinctus
Burchell's sandgrouse, Pterocles burchelli

Order: Otidiformes

Common name: BustardsFamily: Otididae

Bustards are large terrestrial birds mainly associated with dry open country and steppes in the Old World. They are omnivorous and nest on the ground. They walk steadily on strong legs and big toes, pecking for food as they go. They have long broad wings with "fingered" wingtips and striking patterns in flight. Many have interesting mating displays.

Kori bustard, Ardeotis kori
Ludwig's bustard, Neotis ludwigii
Denham's bustard, Neotis denhami (V)
White-bellied bustard, Eupodotis senegalensis (V)
Karoo bustard, Eupodotis vigorsii
Rüppell's bustard, Eupodotis rueppellii
Red-crested bustard, Eupodotis ruficrista
White-quilled bustard, Eupodotis afroides
Black-bellied bustard, Lissotis melanogaster

Order: Musophagiformes
Common name: TuracosFamily: Musophagidae

The turacos, plantain eaters, and go-away-birds make up the bird family Musophagidae. They are medium-sized arboreal birds. The turacos and plantain eaters are brightly coloured, usually in blue, green, or purple. The go-away birds are mostly grey and white.

Schalow's turaco, Tauraco schalowi
Ross's turaco, Musophaga rossae (V)
Gray go-away-bird, Corythaixoides concolor

Order: Cuculiformes
Common name: cuckoos, coucals, roadrunners and anisFamily: Cuculidae

The family Cuculidae includes cuckoos, roadrunners, and anis. These birds are of variable size with slender bodies, long tails, and strong legs. Most of the cuckoo species of the Old World are brood parasites.

Senegal coucal, Centropus senegalensis
Coppery-tailed coucal, Centropus cupreicaudus
White-browed coucal, Centropus superciliosus
Black coucal, Centropus grillii
Great spotted cuckoo, Clamator glandarius
Levaillant's cuckoo, Clamator levaillantii
Pied cuckoo, Clamator jacobinus
Thick-billed cuckoo, Pachycoccyx audeberti
Dideric cuckoo, Chrysococcyx caprius
Klaas's cuckoo, Chrysococcyx klaas
African emerald cuckoo, Chrysococcyx cupreus
Black cuckoo, Cuculus clamosus
Red-chested cuckoo, Cuculus solitarius 
African cuckoo, Cuculus gularis
Common cuckoo, Cuculus canorus

Order: Caprimulgiformes

Nightjars and allies
Family: Caprimulgidae

Nightjars are medium-sized nocturnal birds that usually nest on the ground. They have long wings, short legs, and very short bills. Most have small feet, of little use for walking, and long pointed wings. Their soft plumage is camouflaged to resemble bark or leaves.

Pennant-winged nightjar, Caprimulgus vexillarius
Eurasian nightjar, Caprimulgus europaeus
Rufous-cheeked nightjar, Caprimulgus rufigena
Fiery-necked nightjar, Caprimulgus pectoralis
Swamp nightjar, Caprimulgus natalensis
Freckled nightjar, Caprimulgus tristigma
Square-tailed nightjar, Caprimulgus fossii

Swifts

Family: Apodidae

Swifts are small birds which spend the majority of their lives flying. These birds have very short legs and never settle voluntarily on the ground, perching instead only on vertical surfaces. Many swifts have long swept-back wings which resemble a crescent or boomerang.

Bat-like spinetail, Neafrapus boehmi
Alpine swift, Apus melba
Common swift, Apus apus
African swift, Apus barbatus 
Bradfield's swift, Apus bradfieldi
Little swift, Apus affinis
Horus swift, Apus horus
White-rumped swift, Apus caffer
African palm-swift, Cypsiurus parvus

Order: Gruiformes

Flufftails
Family: Sarothruridae

The flufftails are a small family of ground-dwelling birds found only in Madagascar and sub-Saharan Africa.

Buff-spotted flufftail, Sarothrura elegans 
Red-chested flufftail, Sarothrura rufa

Rails, gallinules, and coots
Family: Rallidae

Rallidae is a large family of small to medium-sized birds which includes the rails, crakes, coots, and gallinules. Typically they inhabit dense vegetation in damp environments near lakes, swamps, or rivers. In general they are shy and secretive birds, making them difficult to observe. Most species have strong legs and long toes which are well adapted to soft uneven surfaces. They tend to have short, rounded wings and to be weak fliers.

African rail, Rallus caerulescens
Corn crake, Crex crex (V)
African crake, Crex egregia
Spotted crake, Porzana porzana 
Lesser moorhen, Paragallinula angulata
Eurasian moorhen, Gallinula chloropus
Red-knobbed coot, Fulica cristata
Allen's gallinule, Porphyrio alleni
Purple gallinule, Porphyrio martinica  (V)
African swamphen, Porphyrio madagascariensis
Striped crake, Amaurornis marginalis
Black crake, Zapornia flavirostra
Baillon's crake, Zapornia pusilla

Finfoots
Family: Heliornithidae

Heliornithidae is a small family of tropical birds with webbed lobes on their feet similar to those of grebes and coots.

African finfoot, Podica senegalensis

Cranes

Family: Gruidae

Cranes are large, long-legged, and long-necked birds. Unlike the similar-looking but unrelated herons, cranes fly with necks outstretched, not pulled back. Most have elaborate and noisy courting displays or "dances".

Gray crowned-crane, Balearica regulorum
Blue crane, Anthropoides paradisea
Wattled crane, Bugeranus carunculatus

Order: Charadriiformes

Thick-knees
Family: Burhinidae

The thick-knees are a group of waders found worldwide within the tropical zone, with some species also breeding in temperate Europe and Australia. They are medium to large waders with strong black or yellow-black bills, large yellow eyes, and cryptic plumage. Despite being classed as waders, most species have a preference for arid or semi-arid habitats.

Water thick-knee, Burhinus vermiculatus
Spotted thick-knee, Burhinus capensis

Stilts and avocets

Family: Recurvirostridae

Recurvirostridae is a family of large wading birds which includes the avocets and stilts. The avocets have long legs and long up-curved bills. The stilts have extremely long legs and long, thin, straight bills.

Black-winged stilt, Himantopus himantopus
Pied avocet, Recurvirostra avosetta

Oystercatchers
Family: Haematopodidae

The oystercatchers are large and noisy plover-like birds, with strong bills used for smashing or prising open molluscs.

Eurasian oystercatcher, Haematopus ostralegus
African oystercatcher, Haematopus moquini

Plovers and lapwings

Family: Charadriidae

The family Charadriidae includes the plovers, dotterels, and lapwings. They are small to medium-sized birds with compact bodies, short thick necks, and long, usually pointed, wings. They are found in open country worldwide, mostly in habitats near water.

Black-bellied plover, Pluvialis squatarola
American golden-plover, Pluvialis dominica (V)
Pacific golden-plover, Pluvialis fulva (V)
Long-toed lapwing, Vanellus crassirostris
Blacksmith lapwing, Vanellus armatus
Spur-winged lapwing, Vanellus spinosus (V)
White-headed lapwing, Vanellus albiceps
Crowned lapwing, Vanellus coronatus
Wattled lapwing, Vanellus senegallus
Lesser sand-plover, Charadrius mongolus (V)
Greater sand-plover, Charadrius leschenaultii (V)
Caspian plover, Charadrius asiaticus
Kittlitz's plover, Charadrius pecuarius
Kentish plover, Charadrius alexandrinus 
Common ringed plover, Charadrius hiaticula
Three-banded plover, Charadrius tricollaris
White-fronted plover, Charadrius marginatus
Chestnut-banded plover, Charadrius pallidus

Painted-snipes
Family: Rostratulidae

Painted-snipes are short-legged, long-billed birds similar in shape to the true snipes, but more brightly coloured.

Greater painted-snipe, Rostratula benghalensis

Jacanas
Family: Jacanidae

The jacanas are a group of waders found throughout the tropics. They are identifiable by their huge feet and claws which enable them to walk on floating vegetation in the shallow lakes that are their preferred habitat.

Lesser jacana, Microparra capensis
African jacana, Actophilornis africanus

Sandpipers and allies

Family: Scolopacidae

Scolopacidae is a large diverse family of small to medium-sized shorebirds including the sandpipers, curlews, godwits, shanks, tattlers, woodcocks, snipes, dowitchers, and phalaropes. The majority of these species eat small invertebrates picked out of the mud or soil. Variation in length of legs and bills enables multiple species to feed in the same habitat, particularly on the coast, without direct competition for food.

Whimbrel, Numenius phaeopus
Eurasian curlew, Numenius arquata (V)
Bar-tailed godwit, Limosa lapponica
Black-tailed godwit, Limosa limosa (V)
Ruddy turnstone, Arenaria interpres
Great knot, Calidris tenuirostris (V)
Red knot, Calidris canutus
Ruff, Calidris pugnax
Broad-billed sandpiper, Calidris falcinellus (V)
Curlew sandpiper, Calidris ferruginea
Sanderling, Calidris alba
Baird's sandpiper, Calidris bairdii (V)
Little stint, Calidris minuta
White-rumped sandpiper, Calidris fuscicollis (V)
Buff-breasted sandpiper, Calidris subruficollis (V)
Pectoral sandpiper, Calidris melanotos (V)
Great snipe, Gallinago media
African snipe, Gallinago nigripennis
Terek sandpiper, Xenus cinereus
Wilson's phalarope, Phalaropus tricolor (V)
Red-necked phalarope, Phalaropus lobatus
Red phalarope, Phalaropus fulicarius
Common sandpiper, Actitis hypoleucos
Green sandpiper, Tringa ochropus 
Common greenshank, Tringa nebularia
Lesser yellowlegs, Tringa flavipes (V)
Marsh sandpiper, Tringa stagnatilis
Wood sandpiper, Tringa glareola
Common redshank, Tringa totanus

Buttonquail
Family: Turnicidae

The buttonquail are small, drab, running birds which resemble the true quails. The female is the brighter of the sexes and initiates courtship. The male incubates the eggs and tends the young.

Small buttonquail, Turnix sylvaticus

Pratincoles and coursers
Family: Glareolidae

Glareolidae is a family of wading birds comprising the pratincoles, which have short legs, long pointed wings, and long forked tails, and the coursers, which have long legs, short wings, and long, pointed bills which curve downwards.

Burchell's courser, Cursorius rufus
Temminck's courser, Cursorius temminckii
Double-banded courser, Smutsornis africanus
Three-banded courser, Rhinoptilus cinctus
Bronze-winged courser, Rhinoptilus chalcopterus
Collared pratincole, Glareola pratincola
Black-winged pratincole, Glareola nordmanni
Rock pratincole, Glareola nuchalis

Skuas and jaegers
Family: Stercorariidae

The family Stercorariidae are, in general, medium to large birds, typically with grey or brown plumage, often with white markings on the wings. They nest on the ground in temperate and arctic regions and are long-distance migrants.

Brown skua, Stercorarius antarctica
Pomarine jaeger, Stercorarius pomarinus
Parasitic jaeger, Stercorarius parasiticus
Long-tailed jaeger, Stercorarius longicaudus (V)

Gulls, terns, and skimmers

Family: Laridae

Laridae is a family of medium to large seabirds, the gulls, terns, and skimmers. Gulls are typically grey or white, often with black markings on the head or wings. They have stout, longish bills and webbed feet. Terns are a group of generally medium to large seabirds typically with grey or white plumage, often with black markings on the head. Most terns hunt fish by diving but some pick insects off the surface of fresh water. Terns are generally long-lived birds, with several species known to live in excess of 30 years. Skimmers are a small family of tropical tern-like birds. They have an elongated lower mandible which they use to feed by flying low over the water surface and skimming the water for small fish.

Sabine's gull, Xema sabini
Gray-hooded gull, Chroicocephalus cirrocephalus
Hartlaub's gull, Chroicocephalus hartlaubii
Black-headed gull, Chroicocephalus ridibundus (V)
Franklin's gull, Leucophaeus pipixcan (V)
Yellow-legged gull, Larus michahellis (V)
Lesser black-backed gull, Larus fuscus (V)
Kelp gull, Larus dominicanus
Sooty tern, Onychoprion fuscatus (V)
Little tern, Sternula albifrons (V)
Damara tern, Sternula balaenarum
Gull-billed tern, Gelochelidon nilotica (V)
Caspian tern, Hydroprogne caspia
Black tern, Chlidonias niger
White-winged tern, Chlidonias leucopterus
Whiskered tern, Chlidonias hybrida
Common tern, Sterna hirundo
Arctic tern, Sterna paradisaea 
Antarctic tern, Sterna vittata (V)
Great crested tern, Thalasseus bergii
Sandwich tern, Thalasseus sandvicensis
Elegant tern, Thalasseus elegans (V)
West African crested tern, Thalasseus albididorsalis (V)
Black skimmer, Rynchops niger (V)
African skimmer, Rynchops flavirostris

Order: Phaethontiformes
Common name: TropicbirdsFamily: Phaethontidae

Tropicbirds are slender white birds of tropical oceans with exceptionally long central tail feathers. Their heads and long wings have black markings.

White-tailed tropicbird, Phaethon lepturus (V)
Red-billed tropicbird, Phaethon aethereus (V)

Order: Sphenisciformes

Common name: PenguinsFamily: Spheniscidae

The penguins are a group of aquatic, flightless birds living almost exclusively in the Southern Hemisphere. Most penguins feed on krill, fish, squid, and other forms of sealife caught while swimming underwater.

Little penguin, Eudyptula minor (V)
African penguin, Spheniscus demersus

Order: Procellariformes

Albatrosses
Family: Diomedeidae

The albatrosses are among the largest of flying birds, and the great albatrosses from the genus Diomedea have the largest wingspans of any extant birds.

Yellow-nosed albatross, Thalassarche chlororhynchos
Gray-headed albatross, Thalassarche chrysostoma (V)
White-capped albatross, Thalassarche cauta
Black-browed albatross, Thalassarche melanophris
Wandering albatross, Diomedea exulans

Southern storm-petrels

Family: Oceanitidae

The storm-petrels are the smallest seabirds, relatives of the petrels, feeding on planktonic crustaceans and small fish picked from the surface, typically while hovering. The flight is fluttering and sometimes bat-like. Until 2018, this family's species were included with the other storm-petrels in family Hydrobatidae.

Wilson's storm-petrel, Oceanites oceanicus
White-bellied storm-petrel, Fregetta grallaria (V)
Black-bellied storm-petrel, Fregetta tropica

Northern storm-petrels
Family: Hydrobatidae

Though the members of this family are similar in many respects to the southern storm-petrels, including their general appearance and habits, there are enough genetic differences to warrant their placement in a separate family.

European storm-petrel, Hydrobates pelagicus
Leach's storm-petrel, Hydrobates leucorhous
Band-rumped storm-petrel, Hydrobates castro (V)

Shearwaters and petrels
Family: Procellariidae

The procellariids are the main group of medium-sized "true petrels", characterised by united nostrils with medium septum and a long outer functional primary.

Southern giant-petrel, Macronectes giganteus
Northern giant-petrel, Macronectes halli
Southern fulmar, Fulmarus glacialoides (V)
Cape petrel, Daption capense
Great-winged petrel, Pterodroma macroptera
Soft-plumaged petrel, Pterodroma mollis
Barau's petrel, Pterodroma baraui (V)
Atlantic petrel, Pterodroma incerta (V)
Fairy prion, Pachyptila turtur 
Antarctic prion, Pachyptila desolata
Bulwer's petrel, Bulweria bulwerii (V)
White-chinned petrel, Procellaria aequinoctialis
Spectacled petrel, Procellaria conspicillata
Cory's shearwater, Calonectris borealis
Great shearwater, Ardenna gravis
Sooty shearwater, Ardenna griseus
Manx shearwater, Puffinus puffinus
Tropical shearwater, Puffinus bailloni (V)

Order: Ciconiiformes

Common name: StorksFamily: Ciconiidae

Storks are large, long-legged, long-necked, wading birds with long, stout bills. Storks are mute, but bill-clattering is an important mode of communication at the nest. Their nests can be large and may be reused for many years. Many species are migratory.

African openbill, Anastomus lamelligerus
Black stork, Ciconia nigra
Abdim's stork, Ciconia abdimii
African woolly-necked stork, Ciconia microscelis
White stork, Ciconia ciconia
Saddle-billed stork, Ephippiorhynchus senegalensis
Marabou stork, Leptoptilos crumenifer
Yellow-billed stork, Mycteria ibis

Order: Suliformes

Boobies and gannets

Family: Sulidae

The sulids comprise the gannets and boobies. Both groups are medium to large coastal seabirds that plunge-dive for fish.

Brown booby, Sula leucogaster (V)
Red-footed booby, Sula sula (V)
Cape gannet, Morus capensis
Australasian gannet, Morus serrator (V)

Anhingas
Family: Anhingidae

Anhingas or darters are often called "snake-birds" because of their long thin neck, which gives a snake-like appearance when they swim with their bodies submerged. The males have black and dark-brown plumage, an erectile crest on the nape and a larger bill than the female. The females have much paler plumage especially on the neck and underparts. The darters have completely webbed feet and their legs are short and set far back on the body. Their plumage is somewhat permeable, like that of cormorants, and they spread their wings to dry after diving.

African darter, Anhinga rufa

Cormorants and shags
Family: Phalacrocoracidae

Phalacrocoracidae is a family of medium to large coastal, fish-eating seabirds that includes cormorants and shags. Plumage colouration varies, with the majority having mainly dark plumage, some species being black-and-white, and a few being colourful.

Long-tailed cormorant, Microcarbo africanus
Crowned cormorant, Microcarbo coronatus
Bank cormorant, Phalacrocorax neglectus
Cape cormorant, Phalacrocorax capensis
Great cormorant, Phalacrocorax carbo

Order: Pelecaniformes

Pelicans
Family: Pelecanidae

Pelicans are large water birds with a distinctive pouch under their beak. They have webbed feet with four toes.

Great white pelican, Pelecanus onocrotalus
Pink-backed pelican, Pelecanus rufescens

Hamerkop
Family: Scopidae

The hamerkop is a medium-sized bird with a long shaggy crest. The shape of its head with a curved bill and crest at the back is reminiscent of a hammer, hence its name. Its plumage is drab-brown all over.

Hamerkop, Scopus umbretta

Herons, egrets, and bitterns

Family: Ardeidae

The family Ardeidae contains the bitterns, herons, and egrets. Herons and egrets are medium to large wading birds with long necks and legs. Bitterns tend to be shorter necked and more wary. Members of Ardeidae fly with their necks retracted, unlike other long-necked birds such as storks, ibises, and spoonbills.

Great bittern, Botaurus stellaris
Little bittern, Ixobrychus minutus
Dwarf bittern, Ixobrychus sturmii
Gray heron, Ardea cinerea
Black-headed heron, Ardea melanocephala
Goliath heron, Ardea goliath
Purple heron, Ardea purpurea
Great egret, Ardea alba
Intermediate egret, Ardea intermedia
Little egret, Egretta garzetta
Slaty egret, Egretta vinaceigula
Black heron, Egretta ardesiaca
Cattle egret, Bubulcus ibis
Squacco heron, Ardeola ralloides
Rufous-bellied heron, Ardeola rufiventris
Striated heron, Butorides striata
Black-crowned night-heron, Nycticorax nycticorax
White-backed night-heron, Gorsachius leuconotus

Ibises and spoonbills

Family: Threskiornithidae

Threskiornithidae is a family of large terrestrial and wading birds which includes the ibises and spoonbills. They have long, broad wings with 11 primary and about 20 secondary feathers. They are strong fliers and despite their size and weight, very capable soarers.

Glossy ibis, Plegadis falcinellus
African sacred ibis, Threskiornis aethiopicus
Hadada ibis, Bostrychia hagedash
African spoonbill, Platalea alba

Order: Accipitriformes

Secretarybird
Family: Sagittariidae

The secretarybird is a bird of prey which is easily distinguished from other raptors by its long crane-like legs.

Secretarybird, Sagittarius serpentarius

Osprey
Family: Pandionidae

The family Pandionidae contains only one species, the osprey. The osprey is a medium-large raptor which is a specialist fish-eater with a worldwide distribution.

Osprey, Pandion haliaetus

Hawks, eagles, and kites

Family: Accipitridae

Accipitridae is a family of birds of prey which includes hawks, eagles, kites, harriers, and Old World vultures. These birds have powerful hooked beaks for tearing flesh from their prey, strong legs, powerful talons, and keen eyesight.

Black-winged kite, Elanus caeruleus
African harrier-hawk, Polyboroides typus
Palm-nut vulture, Gypohierax angolensis (V)
Egyptian vulture, Neophron percnopterus (V)
European honey-buzzard, Pernis apivorus
African cuckoo-hawk, Aviceda cuculoides
White-headed vulture, Trigonoceps occipitalis
Lappet-faced vulture, Torgos tracheliotos
Hooded vulture, Necrosyrtes monachus
White-backed vulture, Gyps africanus
Cape griffon, Gyps coprotheres
Bateleur, Terathopius ecaudatus
Black-chested snake-eagle, Circaetus pectoralis
Brown snake-eagle, Circaetus cinereus
Banded snake-eagle, Circaetus cinerascens
Bat hawk, Macheiramphus alcinus
Crowned eagle, Stephanoaetus coronatus (V)
Martial eagle, Polemaetus bellicosus
Long-crested eagle, Lophaetus occipitalis
Lesser spotted eagle, Clanga pomarina
Wahlberg's eagle, Hieraaetus wahlbergi
Booted eagle, Hieraaetus pennatus
Ayres's hawk-eagle, Hieraaetus ayresii
Tawny eagle, Aquila rapax
Steppe eagle, Aquila nipalensis
Verreaux's eagle, Aquila verreauxii
African hawk-eagle, Aquila spilogaster
Lizard buzzard, Kaupifalco monogrammicus
Dark chanting-goshawk, Melierax metabates
Pale chanting-goshawk, Melierax canorus
Gabar goshawk, Micronisus gabar
Eurasian marsh-harrier, Circus aeruginosus (V)
African marsh-harrier, Circus ranivorus
Black harrier, Circus maurus
Pallid harrier, Circus macrourus
Montagu's harrier, Circus pygargus
African goshawk, Accipiter tachiro
Shikra, Accipiter badius
Little sparrowhawk, Accipiter minullus
Ovambo sparrowhawk, Accipiter ovampensis
Black goshawk, Accipiter melanoleucus
Black kite, Milvus migrans
African fish-eagle, Haliaeetus vocifer
Common buzzard, Buteo buteo
Long-legged buzzard, Buteo rufinus (V)
Red-necked buzzard, Buteo auguralis (V)
Augur buzzard, Buteo augur
Jackal buzzard, Buteo rufofuscus

Order: Strigiformes

Barn-owls
Family: Tytonidae

Barn-owls are medium to large owls with large heads and characteristic heart-shaped faces. They have long strong legs with powerful talons.

Barn owl, Tyto alba

Owls

Family: Strigidae

The typical owls are small to large solitary nocturnal birds of prey. They have large forward-facing eyes and ears, a hawk-like beak, and a conspicuous circle of feathers around each eye called a facial disk.

African scops-owl, Otus senegalensis
Southern white-faced owl, Ptilopsis granti
Cape eagle-owl, Bubo capensis
Spotted eagle-owl, Bubo africanus
Verreaux's eagle-owl, Bubo lacteus
Pel's fishing-owl, Scotopelia peli
Pearl-spotted owlet, Glaucidium perlatum
African barred owlet, Glaucidium capense
African wood-owl, Strix woodfordii
Marsh owl, Asio capensis

Order: Coliiformes
Common name: MousebirdsFamily: Coliidae

The mousebirds are slender greyish or brown birds with soft, hairlike body feathers and very long thin tails. They are arboreal and scurry through the leaves like rodents in search of berries, fruit and buds. They are acrobatic and can feed upside down. All species have strong claws and reversible outer toes. They also have crests and stubby bills.

White-backed mousebird, Colius colius
Red-faced mousebird, Urocolius indicus

Order: Trogoniformes
Common name: TrogonsFamily: Trogonidae

The family Trogonidae includes trogons and quetzals. Found in tropical woodlands worldwide, they feed on insects and fruit, and their broad bills and weak legs reflect their diet and arboreal habits. Although their flight is fast, they are reluctant to fly any distance. Trogons have soft, often colourful, feathers with distinctive male and female plumage.

Narina trogon, Apaloderma narina

Order: Coraciiformes

Hoopoes
Family: Upupidae

Hoopoes have black, white, and orangey-pink colouring with a large erectile crest on their head.

Eurasian hoopoe, Upupa epops

Woodhoopoes and scimitarbills
Family: Phoeniculidae

The woodhoopoes are related to the hoopoes, hornbills, and ground-hornbills. They most resemble the hoopoes with their long curved bills, used to probe for insects, and short rounded wings. However, they differ in that they have metallic plumage, often blue, green, or purple, and lack an erectile crest.

Green woodhoopoe, Phoeniculus purpureus
Violet woodhoopoe, Phoeniculus damarensis
Common scimitarbill, Rhinopomastus cyanomelas

Hornbills
Family: Bucerotidae

Hornbills are a group of birds whose bill is shaped like a cow's horn, but without a twist, sometimes with a casque on the upper mandible. Frequently, the bill is brightly coloured.

Crowned hornbill, Lophoceros alboterminatus
Bradfield's hornbill, Lophoceros bradfieldi
African gray hornbill, Lophoceros nasutus
Southern yellow-billed hornbill, Tockus leucomelas
Monteiro's hornbill, Tockus monteiri
Southern red-billed hornbill, Tockus rufirostris
Damara red-billed hornbill, Tockus damarensis
Trumpeter hornbill, Bycanistes bucinator

Kingfishers

Family: Alcedinidae

Kingfishers are medium-sized birds with large heads, long pointed bills, short legs, and stubby tails.

Half-collared kingfisher, Alcedo semitorquata
Malachite kingfisher, Corythornis cristatus
African pygmy kingfisher, Ispidina picta
Gray-headed kingfisher, Halcyon leucocephala
Woodland kingfisher, Halcyon senegalensis
Brown-hooded kingfisher, Halcyon albiventris
Striped kingfisher, Halcyon chelicuti
Giant kingfisher, Megaceryle maximus
Pied kingfisher, Ceryle rudis

Bee-eaters
Family: Meropidae

The bee-eaters are a group of near passerine birds; most species are found in Africa but others occur in southern Europe, Madagascar, Australia, and New Guinea. They are characterised by richly coloured plumage, slender bodies, and usually elongated central tail feathers. They have long downturned bills and pointed wings, which give them a swallow-like appearance when seen from afar.

White-fronted bee-eater, Merops bullockoides
Little bee-eater, Merops pusillus
Swallow-tailed bee-eater, Merops hirundineus
Blue-cheeked bee-eater, Merops persicus
Madagascar bee-eater, Merops superciliosus
European bee-eater, Merops apiaster
Northern carmine bee-eater, Merops nubicus (V)
Southern carmine bee-eater, Merops nubicoides

Rollers

Family: Coraciidae

Rollers resemble crows in size and build, but are more closely related to the kingfishers and bee-eaters. They share the colourful appearance of those groups with blues and browns predominating. The two inner front toes are connected, but the outer toe is not.

European roller, Coracias garrulus
Lilac-breasted roller, Coracias caudata
Racket-tailed roller, Coracias spatulata
Rufous-crowned roller, Coracias naevia
Broad-billed roller, Eurystomus glaucurus

Order: Bucerotiformes

Common name: Ground-hornbillsFamily: Bucorvidae

The ground-hornbills are terrestrial birds which feed almost entirely on insects, other birds, snakes, and amphibians.

Southern ground-hornbill, Bucorvus leadbeateri

Order: Piciformes

African barbets
Family: Lybiidae

The barbets are plump birds, with short necks and large heads. They get their name from the bristles which fringe their heavy bills. Most species are brightly coloured.

Crested barbet, Trachyphonus vaillantii
Yellow-fronted tinkerbird, Pogoniulus chrysoconus
Pied barbet, Tricholaema leucomelas
Black-collared barbet, Lybius torquatus

Honeyguides
Family: Indicatoridae

Honeyguides are among the few birds that feed on wax. They are named for the greater honeyguide which leads traditional honey-hunters to bees' nests and, after the hunters have harvested the honey, feeds on the remaining contents of the hive.

Green-backed honeyguide, Prodotiscus zambesiae
Wahlberg's honeyguide, Prodotiscus regulus
Lesser honeyguide, Indicator minor
Greater honeyguide, Indicator indicator

Woodpeckers
Family: Picidae

Woodpeckers are small to medium-sized birds with chisel-like beaks, short legs, stiff tails, and long tongues used for capturing insects. Some species have feet with two toes pointing forward and two backward, while several species have only three toes. Many woodpeckers have the habit of tapping noisily on tree trunks with their beaks.

Cardinal woodpecker, Chloropicus fuscescens
Bearded woodpecker, Chloropicus namaquus
Olive woodpecker, Chloropicus griseocephalus
Bennett's woodpecker, Campethera bennettii
Golden-tailed woodpecker, Campethera abingoni

Order: Falconiformes

Common name: Falcons and caracarasFamily: Falconidae

Falconidae is a family of diurnal birds of prey. They differ from hawks, eagles, and kites in that they kill with their beaks instead of their talons.

Pygmy falcon, Polihierax semitorquatus
Lesser kestrel, Falco naumanni
Rock kestrel, Falco rupicolus
Greater kestrel, Falco rupicoloides
Gray kestrel, Falco ardosiaceus
Dickinson's kestrel, Falco dickinsoni
Red-necked falcon, Falco chicquera
Red-footed falcon, Falco vespertinus
Amur falcon, Falco amurensis
Eleonora's falcon, Falco eleonorae (V)
Sooty falcon, Falco concolor (V)
Eurasian hobby, Falco subbuteo
African hobby, Falco cuvierii
Lanner falcon, Falco biarmicus
Peregrine falcon, Falco peregrinus

Order: Psittaciformes

Old World parrots

Family: Psittaculidae

Characteristic features of parrots include a strong curved bill, an upright stance, strong legs, and clawed zygodactyl feet. Many parrots are vividly coloured, and some are multi-coloured. Old World parrots are found from Africa east across south and southeast Asia and Oceania to Australia and New Zealand.

Rosy-faced lovebird, Agapornis roseicollis
Black-cheeked lovebird, Agapornis nigrigenis

African and New World parrots
Family: Psittacidae

Parrots are small to large birds with a characteristic curved beak. Their upper mandibles have slight mobility in the joint with the skull and they have a generally erect stance. All parrots are zygodactyl, having the four toes on each foot placed two at the front and two to the back. Most of the more than 150 species in this family are found in the New World.

Brown-necked parrot, Poicephalus fuscicollis
Meyer's parrot, Poicephalus meyeri
Rüppell's parrot, Poicephalus rueppellii

Order: Passeriformes

African and green broadbills
Family: Eurylaimidae

The broadbills are small, brightly coloured birds which feed on fruit and also take insects in flycatcher fashion, snapping their broad bills. Their habitat is canopies of wet forests.

African broadbill, Smithornis capensis

Pittas
Family: Pittidae

Pittas are medium-sized by passerine standards and are stocky, with fairly long, strong legs, short tails, and stout bills. Many are brightly coloured. They spend the majority of their time on wet forest floors, eating snails, insects, and similar invertebrates.

African pitta, Pitta angolensis (V)

Cuckooshrikes
Family: Campephagidae

The cuckooshrikes are small to medium-sized passerine birds. They are predominantly greyish with white and black, although some species are brightly coloured.

White-breasted cuckooshrike, Coracina pectoralis
Black cuckooshrike, Campephaga flava

Old World orioles
Family: Oriolidae

The Old World orioles are colourful passerine birds which are not related to the similar-appearing New World orioles.

Eurasian golden oriole, Oriolus oriolus
African golden oriole, Oriolus auratus
African black-headed oriole, Oriolus larvatus

Wattle-eyes and batises
Family: Platysteiridae

The wattle-eyes, or puffback flycatchers, are small stout passerine birds of the African tropics. They get their name from the brightly coloured fleshy eye decorations found in most species in this group.

White-tailed shrike, Lanioturdus torquatus
Chinspot batis, Batis molitor
Pririt batis, Batis pririt

Vangas, helmetshrikes, and allies
Family: Vangidae

The helmetshrikes are similar in build to the shrikes, but tend to be colourful species with distinctive crests or other head ornaments, such as wattles, from which they get their name.

White helmetshrike, Prionops plumatus
Retz's helmetshrike, Prionops retzii

Bushshrikes and allies

Family: Malaconotidae

Bushshrikes are similar in habits to shrikes, hunting insects and other small prey from a perch on a bush. Although similar in build to the shrikes, these tend to be either colourful species or largely black; some species are quite secretive.

Brubru, Nilaus afer
Black-backed puffback, Dryoscopus cubla
Black-crowned tchagra, Tchagra senegala
Brown-crowned tchagra, Tchagra australis
Tropical boubou, Laniarius major
Gabon boubou, Laniarius bicolor
Crimson-breasted gonolek, Laniarius atrococcineus
Bokmakierie, Telophorus zeylonus
Sulphur-breasted bushshrike, Telophorus sulfureopectus
Gray-headed bushshrike, Malaconotus blanchoti

Drongos

Family: Dicruridae

The drongos are mostly black or dark grey in colour, sometimes with metallic tints. They have long forked tails, and some Asian species have elaborate tail decorations. They have short legs and sit very upright when perched, like a shrike. They flycatch or take prey from the ground.

Fork-tailed drongo, Dicrurus adsimilis

Monarch flycatchers
Family: Monarchidae

The monarch flycatchers are small to medium-sized insectivorous passerines which hunt by flycatching.

African paradise-flycatcher, Terpsiphone viridis

Shrikes

Family: Laniidae

Shrikes are passerine birds known for their habit of catching other birds and small animals and impaling the uneaten portions of their bodies on thorns. A shrike's beak is hooked, like that of a typical bird of prey.

Red-backed shrike, Lanius collurio
Lesser gray shrike, Lanius minor
Magpie shrike, Lanius melanoleucus
Northern fiscal, Lanius humeralis
Southern fiscal, Lanius collaris
Souza's shrike, Lanius souzae
White-crowned shrike, Eurocephalus anguitimens

Crows, jays, and magpies
Family: Corvidae

The family Corvidae includes crows, ravens, jays, choughs, magpies, treepies, nutcrackers, and ground jays. Corvids are above average in size among the Passeriformes, and some of the larger species show high levels of intelligence.

House crow, Corvus splendens (V)
Cape crow, Corvus capensis
Pied crow, Corvus albus

Fairy flycatchers
Family: Stenostiridae

Most of the species of this small family are found in Africa, though a few inhabit tropical Asia. They are not closely related to other birds called "flycatchers".

Fairy flycatcher, Stenostira scita

Tits, chickadees, and titmice
Family: Paridae

The Paridae are mainly small stocky woodland species with short stout bills. Some have crests. They are adaptable birds, with a mixed diet including seeds and insects.

Rufous-bellied tit, Melaniparus rufiventris
Southern black-tit, Melaniparus niger
Carp's tit, Melaniparus carpi
Ashy tit, Melaniparus cinerascens
Gray tit, Melaniparus afer

Penduline-tits
Family: Remizidae

The penduline-tits are a group of small passerine birds related to the true tits. They are insectivores.

African penduline-tit, Anthoscopus caroli
Southern penduline-tit, Anthoscopus minutus

Larks

Family: Alaudidae

Larks are small terrestrial birds with often extravagant songs and display flights. Most larks are fairly dull in appearance. Their food is insects and seeds.

Spike-heeled lark, Chersomanes albofasciata
Gray's lark, Ammomanopsis grayi 
Karoo long-billed lark, Certhilauda subcoronata 
Cape lark, Certhilauda curvirostris 
Dusky lark, Pinarocorys nigricans
Black-eared sparrow-lark, Eremopterix australis
Chestnut-backed sparrow-lark, Eremopterix leucotis
Gray-backed sparrow-lark, Eremopterix verticalis
Sabota lark, Calendulauda sabota
Fawn-colored lark, Calendulauda africanoides
Red lark, Calendulauda burra
Barlow's lark, Calendulauda barlowi 
Dune lark, Calendulauda erythrochlamys (E)
Cape clapper lark, Mirafra apiata 
Eastern clapper lark, Mirafra fasciolata
Rufous-naped lark, Mirafra africana
Flappet lark, Mirafra rufocinnamomea
Monotonous lark, Mirafra passerina
Red-capped lark, Calandrella cinerea
Stark's lark, Spizocorys starki
Sclater's lark, Spizocorys sclateri
Pink-billed lark, Spizocorys conirostris
Large-billed lark, Galerida magnirostris

Nicators
Family: Nicatoridae

The nicators are shrike-like, with hooked bills. They are endemic to sub-Saharan Africa.

Eastern nicator, Nicator gularis

African warblers
Family: Macrosphenidae

African warblers are small to medium-sized insectivores which are found in a wide variety of habitats south of the Sahara.

Red-faced crombec, Sylvietta whytii (V)
Cape crombec, Sylvietta rufescens
Rockrunner, Achaetops pycnopygius

Cisticolas and allies

Family: Cisticolidae

The Cisticolidae are warblers found mainly in warmer southern regions of the Old World. They are generally very small birds of drab brown or grey appearance found in open country such as grassland or scrub.

Yellow-bellied eremomela, Eremomela icteropygialis
Greencap eremomela, Eremomela scotops
Yellow-rumped eremomela, Eremomela gregalis 
Burnt-neck eremomela, Eremomela usticollis
Namaqua warbler, Phragmacia substriata
Stierling's wren-warbler, Calamonastes stierlingi
Barred wren-warbler, Calamonastes fasciolatus
Green-backed camaroptera, Camaroptera brachyura
Yellow-breasted apalis, Apalis flavida
Tawny-flanked prinia, Prinia subflava
Black-chested prinia, Prinia flavicans
Karoo prinia, Prinia maculosa
Kopje warbler, Euryptila subcinnamomea 
Rufous-eared warbler, Malcorus pectoralis
Red-faced cisticola, Cisticola erythrops
Rattling cisticola, Cisticola chiniana
Tinkling cisticola, Cisticola rufilatus
Red-headed cisticola, Cisticola subruficapillus
Luapula cisticola, Cisticola luapula
Chirping cisticola, Cisticola pipiens
Levaillant's cisticola, Cisticola tinniens
Piping cisticola, Cisticola fulvicapillus
Zitting cisticola, Cisticola juncidis
Desert cisticola, Cisticola aridulus

Reed warblers and allies

Family: Acrocephalidae

The members of this family are usually rather large for "warblers". Most are rather plain olivaceous brown above with much yellow to beige below. They are usually found in open woodland, reedbeds, or tall grass. The family occurs mostly in southern to western Eurasia and surroundings, but it also ranges far into the Pacific, with some species in Africa.

Olive-tree warbler, Hippolais olivetorum (V)
Icterine warbler, Hippolais icterina
Sedge warbler, Acrocephalus schoenobaenus
Marsh warbler, Acrocephalus palustris
Common reed warbler, Acrocephalus scirpaceus 
Lesser swamp warbler, Acrocephalus gracilirostris
Greater swamp warbler, Acrocephalus rufescens
Great reed warbler, Acrocephalus arundinaceus

Grassbirds and allies
Family: Locustellidae

Locustellidae are a family of small insectivorous songbirds found mainly in Eurasia, Africa, and the Australian region. They are smallish birds with tails that are usually long and pointed, and tend to be drab brownish or buffy all over.

River warbler, Locustella fluviatilis 
Little rush warbler, Bradypterus baboecala

Swallows

Family: Hirundinidae

The family Hirundinidae is adapted to aerial feeding. They have a slender streamlined body, long pointed wings, and a short bill with a wide gape. The feet are adapted to perching rather than walking, and the front toes are partially joined at the base.

Plain martin, Riparia paludicola
Bank swallow, Riparia riparia
Banded martin, Neophedina cincta
Rock martin, Ptyonoprogne fuligula
Barn swallow, Hirundo rustica
Angola swallow, Hirundo angolensis (V)
White-throated swallow, Hirundo albigularis
Wire-tailed swallow, Hirundo smithii
Pearl-breasted swallow, Hirundo dimidiata
Greater striped swallow, Cecropis cucullata
Lesser striped swallow, Cecropis abyssinica
Rufous-chested swallow, Cecropis semirufa
Mosque swallow, Cecropis senegalensis
South African swallow, Petrochelidon spilodera
Common house-martin, Delichon urbicum
Gray-rumped swallow, Pseudhirundo griseopyga

Bulbuls
Family: Pycnonotidae

Bulbuls are medium-sized songbirds. Some are colourful with yellow, red, or orange vents, cheeks, throats or supercilia, but most are drab, with uniform olive-brown to black plumage. Some species have distinct crests.

Yellow-bellied greenbul, Chlorocichla flaviventris
Yellow-throated greenbul, Atimastillas flavicollis (V)
Terrestrial brownbul, Phyllastrephus terrestris
Common bulbul, Pycnonotus barbatus
Black-fronted bulbul, Pycnonotus nigricans
Cape bulbul, Pycnonotus capensis

Leaf warblers
Family: Phylloscopidae

Leaf warblers are a family of small insectivorous birds found mostly in Eurasia and ranging into Wallacea and Africa. The species are of various sizes, often green-plumaged above and yellow below, or more subdued with greyish-green to greyish-brown colours.

Willow warbler, Phylloscopus trochilus

Sylviid warblers, parrotbills, and allies
Family: Sylviidae

The family Sylviidae ("Old World warblers") is a group of small insectivorous passerine birds. They mainly occur as breeding species, as the common name implies, in Europe, Asia and, to a lesser extent, Africa. Most are of generally undistinguished appearance, but many have distinctive songs.

Eurasian blackcap, Sylvia atricapilla (V)
Garden warbler, Sylvia borin
Layard's warbler, Curruca layardi
Chestnut-vented warbler, Curruca subcoerulea
Greater whitethroat, Curruca communis

White-eyes, yuhinas, and allies
Family: Zosteropidae

The white-eyes are small and mostly undistinguished, their plumage above being generally some dull colour like greenish-olive, but some species have a white or bright yellow throat, breast or lower parts, and several have buff flanks. As their name suggests, many species have a white ring around each eye.

Orange River white-eye, Zosterops pallidus
Southern yellow white-eye, Zosterops anderssoni

Laughingthrushes and allies
Family: Leiothrichidae

The members of this family are diverse in size and colouration, though those of genus Turdoides tend to be brown or greyish. The family is found in Africa, India, and southeast Asia.

Arrow-marked babbler, Turdoides jardineii
Bare-cheeked babbler, Turdoides gymnogenys
Southern pied-babbler, Turdoides bicolor
Hartlaub's babbler, Turdoides hartlaubii
Black-faced babbler, Turdoides melanops

Oxpeckers
Family: Buphagidae

As both the English and scientific names of these birds imply, they feed on ectoparasites, primarily ticks, found on large mammals.

Red-billed oxpecker, Buphagus erythrorynchus
Yellow-billed oxpecker, Buphagus africanus

Starlings
Family: Sturnidae

Starlings are small to medium-sized passerine birds. Their flight is strong and direct and they are very gregarious. Their preferred habitat is fairly open country. They eat insects and fruit. Plumage is typically dark with a metallic sheen.

European starling, Sturnus vulgaris (I)
Wattled starling, Creatophora cinerea
Common myna, Acridotheres tristis (V)
Violet-backed starling, Cinnyricinclus leucogaster
Pale-winged starling, Onychognathus nabouroup
Burchell's starling, Lamprotornis australis
Meves's starling, Lamprotornis mevesii
Lesser blue-eared starling, Lamprotornis chloropterus
Sharp-tailed starling, Lamprotornis acuticaudus
Greater blue-eared starling, Lamprotornis chalybaeus
Cape starling, Lamprotornis nitens

Thrushes and allies
Family: Turdidae

The thrushes are a group of passerine birds that occur mainly in the Old World. They are plump, soft plumaged, small to medium-sized insectivores or sometimes omnivores, often feeding on the ground. Many have attractive songs.

Groundscraper thrush, Turdus litsitsirupa
Kurrichane thrush, Turdus libonyana
Karoo thrush, Turdus smithi

Old World flycatchers

Family: Muscicapidae

Old World flycatchers are a large group of small passerine birds native to the Old World. They are mainly small arboreal insectivores. The appearance of these birds is highly varied, but they mostly have weak songs and harsh calls.

Spotted flycatcher, Muscicapa striata
Mariqua flycatcher, Bradornis mariquensis
Pale flycatcher, Agricola pallidus
Chat flycatcher, Agricola infuscatus
Gray tit-flycatcher, Fraseria plumbeus
Ashy flycatcher, Fraseria caerulescens
Herero chat, Melaenornis herero 
Southern black-flycatcher, Melaenornis pammelaina
Karoo scrub-robin, Cercotrichas coryphaeus
Bearded scrub-robin, Cercotrichas quadrivirgata
Kalahari scrub-robin, Cercotrichas paena
Red-backed scrub-robin, Cercotrichas leucophrys
Cape robin-chat, Cossypha caffra
White-browed robin-chat, Cossypha heuglini
Red-capped robin-chat, Cossypha natalensis
Angola cave-chat, Xenocopsychus ansorgei 
Collared palm-thrush, Cichladusa arquata
Rufous-tailed palm-thrush, Cichladusa ruficauda
Thrush nightingale, Luscinia luscinia
Collared flycatcher, Ficedula albicollis (V)
Short-toed rock-thrush, Monticola brevipes
Whinchat, Saxicola rubetra (V)
African stonechat, Saxicola torquatus
Sickle-winged chat, Emarginata sinuata
Karoo chat, Emarginata schlegelii
Tractrac chat, Emarginata tractrac
Southern anteater-chat, Myrmecocichla formicivora
Mountain wheatear, Myrmecocichla monticola
Arnot's chat, Myrmecocichla arnotti
Northern wheatear, Oenanthe oenanthe (V)
Capped wheatear, Oenanthe pileata
Familiar chat, Oenanthe familiaris

Sunbirds and spiderhunters
Family: Nectariniidae

The sunbirds and spiderhunters are very small passerine birds which feed largely on nectar, although they will also take insects, especially when feeding young. Flight is fast and direct on their short wings. Most species can take nectar by hovering like a hummingbird, but usually perch to feed.

Collared sunbird, Hedydipna collaris
Amethyst sunbird, Chalcomitra amethystina
Scarlet-chested sunbird, Chalcomitra senegalensis
Malachite sunbird, Nectarinia famosa
Southern double-collared sunbird, Cinnyris chalybeus
Mariqua sunbird, Cinnyris mariquensis
Shelley's sunbird, Cinnyris shelleyi (V)
Purple-banded sunbird, Cinnyris bifasciatus
White-breasted sunbird, Cinnyris talatala
Variable sunbird, Cinnyris venustus (V)
Dusky sunbird, Cinnyris fuscus
Copper sunbird, Cinnyris cupreus

Weavers and allies

Family: Ploceidae

The weavers are small passerine birds related to the finches. They are seed-eating birds with rounded conical bills. The males of many species are brightly coloured, usually in red or yellow and black, some species show variation in colour only in the breeding season.

Red-billed buffalo-weaver, Bubalornis niger
Scaly weaver, Sporopipes squamifrons
White-browed sparrow-weaver, Plocepasser mahali
Sociable weaver, Philetairus socius
Red-headed weaver, Anaplectes rubriceps
Spectacled weaver, Ploceus ocularis
Cape weaver, Ploceus capensis
Holub's golden-weaver, Ploceus xanthops
Southern brown-throated weaver, Ploceus xanthopterus
Lesser masked-weaver, Ploceus intermedius
Southern masked-weaver, Ploceus velatus
Village weaver, Ploceus cucullatus
Chestnut weaver, Ploceus rubiginosus
Cardinal quelea, Quelea cardinalis (V)
Red-headed quelea, Quelea erythrops (V)
Red-billed quelea, Quelea quelea
Southern red bishop, Euplectes orix
Yellow-crowned bishop, Euplectes afer
White-winged widowbird, Euplectes albonotatus
Fan-tailed widowbird, Euplectes axillaris
Grosbeak weaver, Amblyospiza albifrons

Waxbills and allies

Family: Estrildidae

The estrildid finches are small passerine birds of the Old World tropics and Australasia. They are gregarious and often colonial seed eaters with short thick but pointed bills. They are all similar in structure and habits, but have wide variation in plumage colours and patterns.

Bronze mannikin, Spermestes cucullatus
Magpie mannikin, Spermestes fringilloides (V)
Black-faced waxbill, Brunhilda erythronotos
Angola waxbill, Coccopygia bocagei (H)
Cinderella waxbill, Glaucestrilda thomensis 
Common waxbill, Estrilda astrild
Quailfinch, Ortygospiza fuscocrissa
Cut-throat, Amadina fasciata
Red-headed finch, Amadina erythrocephala
Zebra waxbill, Amandava subflava
Violet-eared waxbill, Uraeginthus granatina
Southern cordonbleu, Uraeginthus angolensis
Green-winged pytilia, Pytilia melba
Orange-winged pytilia, Pytilia afra
Red-billed firefinch, Lagonosticta senegala
Jameson's firefinch, Lagonosticta rhodopareia
Brown firefinch, Lagonosticta nitidula

Indigobirds

Family: Viduidae

The indigobirds are finch-like species which usually have black or indigo predominating in their plumage. All are brood parasites, which lay their eggs in the nests of estrildid finches.

Pin-tailed whydah, Vidua macroura
Broad-tailed paradise-whydah, Vidua obtusa
Eastern paradise-whydah, Vidua paradisaea
Shaft-tailed whydah, Vidua regia
Village indigobird, Vidua chalybeata
Purple indigobird, Vidua purpurascens
Parasitic weaver, Anomalospiza imberbis

Old World sparrows
Family: Passeridae

Sparrows are small passerine birds. In general, sparrows tend to be small, plump, brown or grey birds with short tails and short powerful beaks. Sparrows are seed eaters, but they also consume small insects.

House sparrow, Passer domesticus (I)
Great rufous sparrow, Passer motitensis
Cape sparrow, Passer melanurus
Northern gray-headed sparrow, Passer griseus
Southern gray-headed sparrow, Passer diffusus
Yellow-throated bush sparrow, Gymnoris superciliaris

Wagtails and pipits

Family: Motacillidae

Motacillidae is a family of small passerine birds with medium to long tails. They include the wagtails, longclaws, and pipits. They are slender ground-feeding insectivores of open country.

Cape wagtail, Motacilla capensis
Gray wagtail, Motacilla cinerea (V)
Western yellow wagtail, Motacilla flava (V)
Citrine wagtail, Motacilla citreola (V)
African pied wagtail, Motacilla aguimp
African pipit, Anthus cinnamomeus
Woodland pipit, Anthus nyassae
Nicholson's pipit, Anthus nicholsoni
Plain-backed pipit, Anthus leucophrys
Buffy pipit, Anthus vaalensis
Tree pipit, Anthus trivialis (V)
Red-throated pipit, Anthus cervinus (V)
Rosy-throated longclaw, Macronyx ameliae

Finches, euphonias, and allies

Family: Fringillidae

Finches are seed-eating passerine birds, that are small to moderately large and have a strong beak, usually conical and in some species very large. All have twelve tail feathers and nine primaries. These birds have a bouncing flight with alternating bouts of flapping and gliding on closed wings, and most sing well.

Yellow-fronted canary, Crithagra mozambicus
Black-throated canary, Crithagra atrogularis
Yellow canary, Crithagra flaviventris
White-throated canary, Crithagra albogularis
Black-headed canary, Serinus alario

Old World buntings
Family: Emberizidae

The emberizids are a large family of passerine birds. They are seed-eating birds with distinctively shaped bills. In Europe, most species are called buntings. Many emberizid species have distinctive head patterns.

Ortolan bunting, Emberiza hortulana (V)
Golden-breasted bunting, Emberiza flaviventris
Cape bunting, Emberiza capensis
Lark-like bunting, Emberiza impetuani
Cinnamon-breasted bunting, Emberiza tahapisi

See also
List of birds
Lists of birds by region

References

External links
Birds of Namibia - World Institute for Conservation and Environment
Bird pages on the Namibia Biodiversity Database

Namibia
Namibia
birds
Namibia